A penalty marker may refer to:
 Penalty flag, a yellow cloth used by game officials in American football, lacrosse, and several other field sports to identify and sometimes mark the location of penalties that occur during regular play.
 Penalty mark or marker, the spot inside the penalty area of an association football pitch where a penalty kick is taken from.